Happy is an unincorporated community located in Perry County, Kentucky, United States.

A post office called Happy was established in 1908. The community's name recalls the happy mood of a large share of the first settlers. Happy has been noted for its unusual place name.

References

Unincorporated communities in Perry County, Kentucky
Unincorporated communities in Kentucky
Coal towns in Kentucky